Subshell may refer to:

 Subshell, of an electron shell
 Subshell, a child process launched by a shell in computing